Homer Moore (born November 12, 1971) is an American former professional mixed martial artist who competed as a Light Heavyweight for the UFC, WEC, and Chicago Red Bears of the IFL

Background
Moore won the 1992 National Junior College Athletic Association NJCAA Collegiate Championship effortlessly. His background wrestling at Phoenix College gave him rise above his competition. Moore's Champion Stat is now part of the National Wrestling Hall of Fame and Museum in Stillwater, Oklahoma. Having a record of this magnitude clones other major sports at their pinnacle.

Mixed martial arts career
Moore reached nearly 100 fights in his MMA career.  He was a resident athlete at the United States Olympic Training Center in the mid '90s.  Subsequently, Homer pursued other fighting opportunities and engaged in the Mixed Martial Arts arena. During Moore's transition, he won 10 straight fights over a 3-year period.

Although injured during his training for the fight, Moore preceded with his first professional fight in the UFC against UFC Middleweight Champion Evan Tanner in UFC 34 - High Voltage. This resulted in a defeat by submission armbar. During Moore's debut fight in the IFL, out of Chicago, Illinois, he fought against jiu-jitsu expert Allan Goes.

Ultimate XARM World Heavyweight Championship
In January 2009, Moore was the first ever to be titled the Ultimate World Heavyweight Champion of Art Davie XARM.  The competitors who participated in this tournament came from a variety of fighting backgrounds that included arm wrestling, football, kickboxing, mixed-martial arts and weightlifting. The winner's objective of this sport was to pin his opponent's arm, knock him out or make him submit.

Moore was also recognized as the "Best Fighter" under XARM's "Best of 2008 Awards".

Mixed martial arts record

|-
|Win
|align=center|
| Vincent Lawler
| KO (punch)
| APC 11: All Powers Combat 11
| 
|align=center| 2
|align=center| 2:18
|Payson, Arizona, United States
|
|-
|Loss
|align=center|25–9–2
| Fabiano Capoani
| TKO (knee injury)
| MMAC: The Revolution
| 
|align=center| 1
|align=center| 3:59
|Washington D.C., United States
|
|-
|Loss
|align=center|25–8–2
| Allan Goes
| TKO (punches)
| IFL: Moline
| 
|align=center| 2
|align=center| 2:56
|Moline, Illinois, United States
|
|-
|Loss
|align=center|25–7–2
| Matt Lucas
| TKO
| RITC 89: Triple Main Event 89
| 
|align=center| 3
|align=center| 1:26
|Maricopa, Arizona, United States
|
|-
|Loss
|align=center|25–6–2
| Chad Griggs
| TKO (strikes)
| RITC 81: Rage in the Cage 81
| 
|align=center| 3
|align=center| 0:30
|Arizona, United States
|
|-
|Win
|align=center|25–5–2
|Marc Zee
| Decision (unanimous)
| RITC 68: Hello Glendale 68
| 
|align=center|3
|align=center| 3:00
|Glendale, Arizona, United States
|
|-
|Loss
|align=center|24–5–2
| Terry Martin
| TKO (submission to punches)
| WEC 14
| 
|align=center| 2
|align=center| 3:14
|Lemoore, California, United States
|Light Heavyweight bout; for the vacant WEC Light Heavyweight Championship.
|-
|Win
|align=center|24–4–2
| Shane Johnson
| KO
| RITC 64: Heart & Soul 64
| 
|align=center| 2
|align=center| 2:17
|Phoenix, Arizona, United States
|
|-
|Win
|align=center|23–4–2
| Tim McMullen
| KO (punches)
| RITC 63: It's Time 63
| 
|align=center| 1
|align=center| 2:01
|Phoenix, Arizona, United States
|
|-
|Win
|align=center|22–4–2
| Andy Montana
| Decision (unanimous)
| RITC 61: Relentless 61
| 
|align=center| 3
|align=center| 3:00
|Phoenix, Arizona, United States
|
|-
|Win
|align=center|21–4–2
| Vince Lucero
| Decision (unanimous)
| RITC 58: Homer vs. Vince 58
| 
|align=center| 3
|align=center| 3:00
|Tempe, Arizona, United States
|
|-
|Loss
|align=center|20–4–2
| Chael Sonnen
| Decision (unanimous)
| ROTR 4.5: Proving Grounds
| 
|align=center| 2
|align=center| 5:00
|Hilo, Hawaii, United States
|
|-
|Win
|align=center|20–3–2
| Thomas Gil
| Submission (keylock)
| RITC 55: Super Heavyweight Showdown 55
| 
|align=center| 3
|align=center| 2:51
|Casa Grande, Arizona, United States
|
|-
| Draw
|align=center|19–3–2
|Dan Severn
| Draw
| RITC 54: The Beast vs The Rock 54
| 
|align=center| 3
|align=center| 3:00
|Phoenix, Arizona, United States
|
|-
|Win
|align=center|19–3–1
| Chris Peak
| Decision (unanimous)
| RITC 53: The Beat Goes On 53
| 
|align=center| 3
|align=center| 3:00
|Phoenix, Arizona, United States
|
|-
|Win
|align=center|18–3–1
| Wojtek Kaszowski
| Decision (unanimous)
| RITC 51: Invasion From the North 51
| 
|align=center| 3
|align=center| 3:00
|Phoenix, Arizona, United States
|
|-
|Loss
|align=center|17–3–1
| Jeremy Horn
| Decision (unanimous)
| ICC 2: Rebellion
| 
|align=center| 3
|align=center| 5:00
|Minneapolis, Minnesota, United States
|
|-
|Loss
|align=center|17–2–1
| Edwin Dewees
| Decision (majority)
| RITC 45: Finally 45
| 
|align=center| 3
|align=center| 3:00
|Phoenix, Arizona, United States
|
|-
|Win
|align=center|17–1–1
| Edwin Aguilar
| TKO (submission to punches)
| CLM 3: Combate Libre Mexico
| 
|align=center| 2
|align=center| N/A
|Mexico
|
|-
|Win
|align=center|16–1–1
| Rich Guerin
| KO
| CLM 3: Combate Libre Mexico
| 
|align=center| 2
|align=center| N/A
|Mexico
|
|-
|Win
|align=center|15–1–1
| Sam Adkins
| Decision
| CLM 3: Combate Libre Mexico
| 
|align=center| 4
|align=center| 5:00
|Mexico
|
|-
|Win
|align=center|14–1–1
| Cory Timmerman
| Decision
| RITC 37: When Countries Collide 37
| 
|align=center| 3
|align=center| 3:00
|Phoenix, Arizona, United States
|
|-
|Win
|align=center|13–1–1
| Vince Lucero
| TKO (submission to punches)
| RITC 35: This Time It's Personal 35
| 
|align=center| 3
|align=center| 1:09
|Phoenix, Arizona, United States
|
|-
|Win
|align=center|12–1–1
| Joe Riggs
| Decision (unanimous)
| RITC 34: Rage in the Cage 34
| 
|align=center| 3
|align=center| 3:00
|Phoenix, Arizona, United States
|Return to Heavyweight.
|-
| Draw
|align=center|11–1–1
|Jim Theobald
| Decision
| UA 1: The Genesis
| 
|align=center| 3
|align=center| 5:00
|Hammond, Indiana, United States
|
|-
|Loss
|align=center|11–1
| Evan Tanner
| Submission (armbar)
| UFC 34
| 
|align=center| 2
|align=center| 0:55
|Las Vegas, Nevada, United States
|Light Heavyweight debut.
|-
|Win
|align=center|11–0
| Kauai Kupihea
| Decision
| RITC 26: Rage in the Cage 26
| 
|align=center| 3
|align=center| 3:00
|Phoenix, Arizona, United States
|
|-
|Win
|align=center|10–0
| Kevin Christopher
| Submission (armbar)
| RITC 24: Rage in the Cage 24
| 
|align=center| 1
|align=center| 1:14
|Phoenix, Arizona, United States
|
|-
|Win
|align=center|9–0
| Allan Sullivan
| Decision (unanimous)
| CF: Cajan Fights
| 
|align=center| 3
|align=center| 5:00
|United States
|
|-
|Win
|align=center|8–0
| Shane Johnson
| TKO
| RITC 22: Rage in the Cage 22
| 
|align=center| 3
|align=center| 1:51
|Phoenix, Arizona, United States
|
|-
|Win
|align=center|7–0
| Kauai Kupihea
| Decision (unanimous)
| RITC 21 - Rage in the Cage 21
| 
|align=center| 3
|align=center| 3:00
|Phoenix, Arizona, United States
|
|-
|Win
|align=center|6–0
| Zack Blackwood
| Submission (armbar)
| RITC 20 - Rage in the Cage 20
| 
|align=center| 1
|align=center| 0:30
|Phoenix, Arizona, United States
|
|-
|Win
|align=center|5–0
| Drew Mora
| Decision (unanimous)
| RITC 19: Rage in the Cage 19
| 
|align=center| 3
|align=center| 3:00
|Phoenix, Arizona, United States
|
|-
|Win
|align=center|4–0
| David Harris
| Decision (3-1)
| RITC 10: Rage in the Cage 10
| 
|align=center| 3
|align=center| 3:00
|Phoenix, Arizona, United States
|
|-
|Win
|align=center|3–0
| Jesus Valdez
| Submission (choke)
| RITC 8: Rage in the Cage 8
| 
|align=center| 1
|align=center| 2:37
|Phoenix, Arizona, United States
|
|-
|Win
|align=center|2–0
| Ron Rumpf
| TKO (submission to punches)
| RITC 5: Rage in the Cage 5
| 
|align=center| 1
|align=center| 1:31
|Phoenix, Arizona, United States
|
|-
|Win
|align=center|1–0
| Jason Middaugh
| Decision (unanimous)
| RITC 4: Rage in the Cage 4
| 
|align=center| 3
|align=center| 3:00
|Phoenix, Arizona, United States
|

References

External links

 Round 1 Televised IFL "Moore"
 Round 2 Televised IFL "Moore"
 XARM World Championship #1 Moore
 Throwback 2007 Amateur wrestling Moore
 Moore Kids wrestling Camp
 
 
 
 Video – Moore Challenges Kimbo Slice

1971 births
Living people
African-American mixed martial artists
Mixed martial artists from Arizona
Light heavyweight mixed martial artists
Mixed martial artists utilizing collegiate wrestling
American male sport wrestlers
Sportspeople from Phoenix, Arizona
American male mixed martial artists
American wrestlers
Phoenix College alumni
People from Maricopa County, Arizona
Sportspeople from the Phoenix metropolitan area
American male boxers
American practitioners of Brazilian jiu-jitsu

Ultimate Fighting Championship male fighters

21st-century African-American sportspeople
20th-century African-American sportspeople